Kuje is a local government area in the Federal Capital Territory in Nigeria.

It has an area of 1,644 km² and a population of 97,367 at the ct 2006 census.

The postal code of the area is 905.

Attractions
Kuje is a busy market city with a range of roadside stores selling pharmaceuticals, provisions, building materials, ironmongery, tools, phone cards, music CDs. It is also home to several "independent" petrol stations which are unpopular because of the apparent inaccuracy of the calibration of their pumps.

Education
Kuje has several state and private schools including Government Secondary School, Kuje Science Primary School, the Capital Science Academy, DFGS Glorious Shining Star Academy and Nigeria-Ghana International College and Aflon Digital Academy

Market
In the centre of Kuje is a colourful market held every 4 days with stalls selling fruit, vegetables, very fresh meat, other provisions, household goods, fabric, shoes, clothing, smoked fish and posters displaying European footballers pictured alongside their houses, wives and cars.

Expansion
Kuje is seeing a rapid expansion in residential building because of its proximity to Abuja and because of the removal of informal settlements along the airport road. There is a network of well tarred roads serving zones of as yet unbuilt housing whilst the existing residential areas are linked by often impassable, potholed dirt roads.

References

External links

 Official Website

Local Government Areas in the Federal Capital Territory (Nigeria)
Populated places in the Federal Capital Territory (Nigeria)